Joël Almada Monteiro (born 5 August 1999) is a Swiss footballer who plays as a forward for Swiss club Young Boys.

Career
On 20 September 2020, Monteiro made his professional debut with Lausanne-Sport in the 2021–21 season in a match against Servette.

Personal life
Monteiro was born in Switzerland to a Cape Verdean family, and has Swiss and Portuguese nationality. His brother Elton Monteiro is also a professional footballer.

References

External links
 
 
 

1999 births
Living people
People from Sion, Switzerland
Swiss men's footballers
Swiss people of Cape Verdean descent
Swiss people of Portuguese descent
Association football forwards
FC Lausanne-Sport players
BSC Young Boys players
FC Stade Lausanne Ouchy players
Swiss 1. Liga (football) players
2. Liga Interregional players
Swiss Super League players
Swiss Challenge League players
Sportspeople from Valais